Grant Osten Waite (born 11 August 1964) is a New Zealand professional golfer.

Waite was born in Palmerston North, New Zealand. He has one PGA Tour victory, the Kemper Open in 1993, and finished second to Tiger Woods at the 2000 Bell Canadian Open.

Waite won the New Zealand Open and the Trafalgar Capital Classic in 1992, and the Utah Open in 1993.  In 1996, Waite shot a final round 60 in the Phoenix Open.

Waite qualified for the 2015 Champions Tour by finishing second at qualifying school in 2014.

Professional wins (4)

PGA Tour wins (1)

PGA Tour playoff record (0–1)

PGA Tour of Australasia wins (1)

PGA Tour of Australasia playoff record (0–1)

Canadian Tour wins (1)

Other wins (1)
1992 Utah Open

Results in major championships

Note: Waite never played in The Open Championship.

CUT = missed the half-way cut
DQ = Disqualified
"T" = tied

Team appearances
Alfred Dunhill Cup (representing New Zealand): 1989, 1992, 1994, 1996, 2000
World Cup (representing New Zealand): 1997

See also
1989 PGA Tour Qualifying School graduates
1992 PGA Tour Qualifying School graduates
2003 PGA Tour Qualifying School graduates

References

External links

New Zealand male golfers
Oklahoma Sooners men's golfers
PGA Tour golfers
PGA Tour of Australasia golfers
PGA Tour Champions golfers
Sportspeople from Palmerston North
Sportspeople from Ocala, Florida
1964 births
Living people